Keele is a civil parish in the district of Newcastle-under-Lyme, Staffordshire, England.  It contains 27 buildings that are recorded in the National Heritage List for England.  Of these, two are listed at Grade II*, the middle of the three grades, and the others are at Grade II, the lowest grade.  The parish contains the village of Keele, buildings forming part of Keele University, and the surrounding area.  The buildings forming Keele University incorporate older buildings, in particular Keele Hall, a former country house, and The Clock House, formerly a stable block and coach house, both of which are listed, together with associated structures, including three lodges.  The only modern building in the complex to be listed is the chapel.  The other listed buildings include a timber framed house in the village, a summer house, a church and memorials and a sundial in the churchyard, a milepost, and a war memorial.


Key

Buildings

References

Citations

Sources

Lists of listed buildings in Staffordshire
Borough of Newcastle-under-Lyme